Garden of Allah may refer to:

 Garden of Allah Hotel, a residential hotel  in Hollywood (1927 to 1959) popular with writers, musicians and movie stars
 Garden of Allah (cabaret), a gay cabaret in Seattle that opened in 1946
 The Garden of Allah (novel), a 1904 novel by Robert Smythe Hichens
 The Garden of Allah (1916 film), starring Helen War, produced by Selig Polyscope Company Pictures
 The Garden of Allah (1927 film), based on the novel
 The Garden of Allah (1936 film), based on the novel
 "The Garden of Allah" (song), a 1995 song by Don Henley
 The Garden of Allah, a painting by Maxfield Parrish
 Garden of Allah Ice Plateau, a glacier and ice field connected to the Garden of Eden Ice Plateau in New Zealand's South Island